Kit Douglas Lathrop (born August 10, 1956) is a former American football defensive lineman in the National Football League (NFL) and in the United States Football League (USFL).

College career
He played college football at West Valley College and Arizona State University.

Professional career
In the NFL, he played for the Denver Broncos, the Green Bay Packers, the Kansas City Chiefs, and the Washington Redskins.  In the USFL, he played for the Chicago Blitz, the Arizona Wranglers, and the Arizona Outlaws. Lathrop earned a Super Bowl ring with the Redskins in 1987.

External links
 USFL profile
 – stats at databasefootball.com

1956 births
Living people
American football defensive linemen
Arizona State Sun Devils football players
Arizona Wranglers players
BC Lions coaches
Chicago Blitz players
Denver Broncos players
Edmonton Elks coaches
Green Bay Packers players
Kansas City Chiefs players
Arizona Outlaws players
Ottawa Renegades coaches
Players of American football from San Jose, California
Players of Canadian football from San Jose, California
Washington Redskins players
Arizona State Sun Devils football coaches
UNLV Rebels football coaches
West Valley Vikings football players